Eugoa vasta is a moth of the family Erebidae. It is found on Java.

References

 Natural History Museum Lepidoptera generic names catalog

vasta
Moths described in 1920